Hankinson may refer to:

Hankinson (surname)
Hankinson, North Dakota, a city in Richland County, North Dakota, United States
Hankinson's equation, an equation for predicting the strength of wood
Hankinson-Moreau-Covenhoven House, a house located in Freehold, New Jersey, United States
Lake Hankinson, a lake within the catchment of the Waiau River, New Zealand